James Hitchcock (1930 – 25 December 2015) was an English professional golfer.

Hitchcock was born in Bromley. He won several major professional tournaments including the 1960 British Masters and the 1965 Agfa-Gevaert Tournament. He was selected as a member of the Great Britain and Ireland Ryder Cup team in 1965, losing all three of the matches he played.

Death
Hitchcock died, aged 85, on Christmas Day 2015 in Belgium where he had lived for many years.

Tournament wins
1960 British Masters
1961 East Rand Open (South Africa)
1965 Agfa-Gevaert Tournament, Honda Foursomes Tournament (with Bill Large)

Results in major championships

Note: Hitchcock only played in the Masters Tournament and The Open Championship.

CUT = missed the half-way cut (3rd round cut in 1968 Open Championship)
"T" indicates a tie for a place

Team appearances
Ryder Cup (representing Great Britain): 1965
Amateurs–Professionals Match (representing the Professionals): 1959 (winners)

References

English male golfers
Ryder Cup competitors for Europe
1930 births
2015 deaths